The Klingon language is the constructed language spoken by a fictional alien race called the Klingons, in the Star Trek universe.

Described in the 1985 book The Klingon Dictionary by Marc Okrand and deliberately designed to sound "alien", it has a number of typologically uncommon features. The language's basic sound, along with a few words, was devised by actor James Doohan ("Scotty") and producer Jon Povill for Star Trek: The Motion Picture. That film marked the first time the language had been heard. In all previous appearances, Klingons spoke in English, even to each other. Klingon was subsequently developed by Okrand into a full-fledged language.

Klingon is sometimes referred to as Klingonese (most notably in the Star Trek: The Original Series episode "The Trouble with Tribbles", where it was actually pronounced by a Klingon character as "Klingonee" ), but among the Klingon-speaking community, this is often understood to refer to another Klingon language called Klingonaase that was introduced in John M. Ford's 1984 Star Trek novel The Final Reflection, and appears in other Star Trek novels by Ford.

The play A Klingon Christmas Carol is the first production that is primarily in Klingon (only the narrator speaks English). The opera  is entirely in Klingon.

A small number of people are capable of conversing in Klingon. Because its vocabulary is heavily centered on Star Trek-Klingon concepts such as spacecraft or warfare, it can sometimes be cumbersome for everyday use.

History
The language is first mentioned in the original Star Trek series episode "The Trouble with Tribbles" (1967), but is not heard until Star Trek: The Motion Picture (1979). According to the actor who spoke the lines, Mark Lenard, James Doohan recorded the lines he had written on a tape, and Lenard transcribed the recorded lines in a way he found useful in learning them.

For Star Trek III: The Search for Spock (1984), director Leonard Nimoy and writer-producer Harve Bennett wanted the Klingons to speak a structured language instead of random gibberish, and so commissioned a full language, based on the phrases Doohan had originated, from Marc Okrand, who had earlier constructed four lines of Vulcan dialogue for Star Trek II: The Wrath of Khan.

Okrand enlarged the lexicon and developed a grammar based on Doohan's original dozen words. The language appeared intermittently in later films featuring the original cast; for example, in Star Trek V: The Final Frontier (1989) and in Star Trek VI: The Undiscovered Country (1991), where translation difficulties served as a plot device.

Two "non-canon" dialects of Klingon are hinted at in the novelization of Star Trek III: The Search for Spock, as Saavik speaks in Klingon to the only Klingon officer aboard Cpt. Kruge's starship after his death, as the survivors of the Enterprise's self-destruction transport up from the crumbling Genesis Planet to the Klingon ship. The surviving officer, Maltz, states that he speaks the Rumaiy dialect, while Saavik is speaking to him in the Kumburan dialect of Klingon, per Maltz's spoken reply to her.

With the advent of the series Star Trek: The Next Generation (1987)—in which one of the main characters, Worf, was a Klingon—and successors, the language and various cultural aspects for the fictional species were expanded. In the episode "A Matter of Honor", several members of a Klingon ship's crew speak a language that is not translated for the benefit of the viewer (even Commander Riker, enjoying the benefits of a universal translator, is unable to understand) until one Klingon orders the others to "speak their [i.e., human] language".

A small number of non-Klingon characters were later depicted in Star Trek as having learned to speak Klingon, notably Jean-Luc Picard and Dax.

Language
Hobbyists around the world have studied the Klingon language. The Shakespearean choices were inspired by a remark from High Chancellor Gorkon in Star Trek VI: The Undiscovered Country, who said, "You have not experienced Shakespeare until you have read him in the original Klingon." In the bonus material on the DVD, screenwriter Nicholas Meyer and actor William Shatner both explain that this was an allusion to the German myth that Shakespeare was in fact German.

The Klingon Language Institute exists to promote the language.

CBS Television Studios owns the copyright on the official dictionary and other canonical descriptions of the language. While constructed languages ("conlangs") are viewed as creations with copyright protection, natural languages are not protected, excluding dictionaries and other works created with them. Mizuki Miyashita and Laura Moll note, "Copyrights on dictionaries are unusual because the entries in the dictionary are not copyrightable as the words themselves are facts, and facts can not be copyrighted. However, the formatting, example sentences, and instructions for dictionary use are created by the author, so they are copyrightable."

Okrand had studied some Native American and Southeast Asian languages, and phonological and grammatical features of these languages "worked their way into Klingon, but for the most part, not by design." Okrand himself has stated that a design principle of the Klingon language was dissimilarity to existing natural languages in general, and English in particular. He therefore avoided patterns that are typologically common and deliberately chose features that occur relatively infrequently in human languages. This includes above all the highly asymmetric consonant inventory and the basic word order.

Speakers 
A small number of people are capable of conversing in Klingon. Arika Okrent guessed in her 2009 book In the Land of Invented Languages that there might be 20–30 fluent speakers. Since that time, with the appearance of Duolingo's Klingon course and the increasing popularity of video chat platforms such as Zoom and Discord, the number of conversationally fluent speakers has definitely increased; in 2021, there are perhaps 50-60. Its vocabulary, heavily centered on Star Trek–Klingon concepts such as spacecraft or warfare, can sometimes make it cumbersome for everyday use. For instance, while words for transporter ionizer unit or bridge (of a ship) have been known since close to the language's inception, the word for bridge in the sense of a crossing over water was unknown until August 2012. Nonetheless, mundane conversations are possible among skilled speakers.

One Klingon speaker, d'Armond Speers, raised his son Alec to speak Klingon as a first language, whilst the boy's mother communicated with him in English. Alec rarely responded to his father in Klingon, although when he did, his pronunciation was "excellent". After Alec's fifth birthday, Speers reported that his son eventually stopped responding to him when spoken to in Klingon as he clearly did not enjoy it, so Speers switched to English.

In 2007, a report surfaced that Multnomah County, Oregon, was hiring Klingon translators for its mental health program in case patients came into a psychiatric hospital speaking nothing but Klingon. Most circulations of the report seemingly implied that this was a problem that health officials faced before; however, the original report indicated that this was just a precaution for a hypothetical and that said translator would only be paid on an as needed basis. After the report was misinterpreted, the County issued another release noting that releasing the original report was a "mistake".

In May 2009, Simon & Schuster, in collaboration with Ultralingua Inc., a developer of electronic dictionary applications, announced the release of a suite of electronic Klingon language software for most computer platforms including a dictionary, a phrasebook, and an audio learning tool.

In September 2011, Eurotalk released the "Learn Klingon" course in its Talk Now! series. The language is displayed in both Latin and pIqaD fonts, making this the first language course written in pIqaD and approved by CBS and Marc Okrand. It was translated by Jonathan Brown and Okrand and uses the  TrueType font.

In August 2016, a company in the United Kingdom, Bidvine, began offering Klingon lessons as one of their services.

In March 2018, the popular language learning site Duolingo opened a beta course in Klingon. After it proved its effectiveness, the company offered to promote it from beta status, but due to ongoing software issues regarding Klingon's unexpected use of upper- and lower-case letters and the apostrophe as a consonant instead of punctuation, the course developers chose not to accept the offer until the problems were addressed.

There are Klingon language meetings and linguists or students are interested in researching this topic, even writing essays about the language or its users. 

Klingon speakers are also referred to in non-Star Trek TV series, including Frasier, The Big Bang Theory, and Lucifer, and were heavily featured in the "My Big Fat Geek Wedding" episode of The Simpsons. In the 2017 film Please Stand By, in which a young autistic woman played by Dakota Fanning elopes from her group home in San Francisco to deliver a Star Trek screenplay she wrote to Paramount Pictures, a Los Angeles police officer played by Patton Oswalt coaxes her out of hiding by speaking with her in Klingon.

Other media

In 2010, a Chicago Theatre company presented a version of Charles Dickens' A Christmas Carol in Klingon language and a Klingon setting. On September 25, 2010, the Washington Shakespeare Company (now known as WSC Avant Bard) performed selections from Hamlet and Much Ado About Nothing in the Klingon language in Arlington County, Virginia. The performance was proposed by Okrand in his capacity as chairman of the group's board. This performance was reprised on February 27, 2011 featuring Stephen Fry as the Klingon Osric and was filmed by the BBC as part of a 5-part documentary on language entitled Fry's Planet Word.

Google Search and Minecraft, Java edition, each have a Klingon language setting.

The 2003–2010 version of the puzzle globe logo of Wikipedia, representing its multilingualism, contained a Klingon character. When updated in 2010, the Klingon character was removed from the logo, and substituted with one from the Ge'ez script. A Klingon language Wikipedia was started in June 2004 at tlh.wikipedia.org. It was permanently locked in August 2005 and moved to Wikia. The Klingon Wiktionary was closed in 2008.

The file management software XYplorer has been translated into Klingon by its developer.

Microsoft's Bing Translator attempts to translate Klingon from and to other languages. It can do a good job with individual words, and with phrases included in its training corpus, but it is not well tuned for Klingon's system of prefixes and suffixes. For example,  "You must study it" is rendered instead as "They Must Study."

In July 2015, when Conservative Welsh Assembly Member Darren Millar formally asked the Welsh Economy Minister Edwina Hart about the Welsh Government's policy funding research into sightings of UFOs at Cardiff Airport, a press officer in the Minister's office issued a written reply in Klingon: , which was translated as: "The minister will reply in due course. However this is a non-devolved matter."

With the digital-only release of Star Trek: Discovery in 2017, streaming service Netflix announced it would provide Klingon subtitles for the entire first season, translated by Klingon language expert Lieven L. Litaer.  They can be enabled like any other language provided by the streaming service, and are shown as the phonetic pronunciation rather than Klingon script.

In 2017, a version of “The Gummy Bear Song” was uploaded to YouTube, fully translated to the Klingon language. Its title, “”, translates to English as “I am a sabre bear that is chewy.” The version was released to iTunes in 2018.

In 2020 the German artist Hans Solo (Äi-Tiem) released an EP NuqneH, whose 5 tracks are completely rapped in Klingon language.

Language learning sources 
Duolingo features a course for Klingon, which was released on March 15, 2018 and is now in beta testing.
The Klingon Language Institute provides a Learn Klingon Online series of lessons to its members. The first few lessons are free to sample.

Canon
An important concept to spoken and written Klingon is canonicity. Only words and grammatical forms introduced by Marc Okrand are considered canonical Klingon by the KLI and most Klingonists. However, as the growing number of speakers employ different strategies to express themselves, it is often unclear as to what level of neologism is permissible. New vocabulary has been collected in a list maintained by the KLI until 2005 and has since then been followed up by Klingon expert Lieven Litaer.

Internal history
Within the fictional universe of Star Trek, Klingon is derived from the original language spoken by the messianic figure Kahless the Unforgettable, who united the Klingon home-world of  under one empire more than 1500 years ago. Many dialects exist, but the standardized dialect of prestige is almost invariably that of the sitting emperor.

Sources
The Klingon Language Institute regards the following works as canon Klingon; they serve as sources of Klingon vocabulary and grammar for all other works.

 Books
The Klingon Dictionary (TKD)
The Klingon Way (TKW)
Klingon for the Galactic Traveler (KGT)
Sarek, a novel which includes some Klingon words
Federation Travel Guide, a pamphlet from Pocket Books
: The Klingon Epic, ed. Floris Schönfeld et al., trans. Marc Okrand.

 Audio tapes
Conversational Klingon (CK)
Power Klingon (PK)

 Electronic resources
 The Klingon Language Suite, language-learning tools from Ultralingua with Simon & Schuster
 Star Trek: Klingon, a CD-ROM game (KCD, also STK). The CD-ROM includes a Klingon learning module with speech recognition to train the player in Klingon pronunciation; this module was developed by Dragon Systems, Inc. (which is credited on the box and in the CD-ROM) in collaboration with Marc Okrand.
 Talk Now! Learn Klingon a beginners' language course for Klingon by Eurotalk and translated by Jonathan Brown (also known as ) and Marc Okrand. (2011)

 Other sources
 certain Skybox Trading Cards (SKY)
 a Star Trek Bird of Prey poster (BoP)
 on-line and in-person text/speech by Marc Okrand (mostly newsgroup postings)

The letters in parentheses following each item (if any) indicate the acronym of each source - used when quoting canon.

Phonology

Klingon has been developed with a phonology that, while based on human natural languages, is intended to sound alien to human ears. When initially developed, Paramount Pictures (owners of the Star Trek franchise) wanted the Klingon language to be guttural and harsh and Okrand wanted it to be unusual, so he selected sounds that combined in ways not generally found in other languages. The effect is mainly achieved by the use of a number of retroflex and uvular consonants in the language's inventory. Klingon has twenty-one consonants and five vowels. Klingon is normally written in a variant of the Latin alphabet. The orthography of this transliteration is case-sensitive, that is, upper and lower case letters are not interchangeable (uppercase letters mostly represent sounds different from those expected by English speakers), although with the exception of Q/q there are no minimal pairs between case.

Consonants
The inventory of consonants in Klingon is spread over a number of places of articulation. In spite of this, the inventory has many gaps: Klingon has no velar plosives, and only one sibilant fricative. Deliberately, this arrangement is very different from that of most human languages. The combination of an aspirated voiceless alveolar plosive  and a voiced retroflex plosive  is particularly unusual.

There are a few dialectal pronunciation differences (it is not known if the aforementioned non-canon Kumburan or Rumaiy dialects of  hinted at in the novelization of Star Trek III: The Search for Spock might differ):

In the Morskan dialect:
 is a central affricate 
 is realized as glottal  syllable-initially and deleted syllable-finally
 is realized as a velar fricative

Vowels
In contrast to its consonants, Klingon's inventory of vowels is simple, and similar to those of many human languages, such as Spanish or Japanese. There are five vowels spaced more or less evenly around the vowel space, with two back rounded vowels, one back unrounded vowel, and two front or near-front unrounded vowels. The vowel inventory is asymmetrical in that the back rounded vowels are tense and the front vowels are lax.

This enhances the sense that Klingon is a clipped and harsh-sounding language.

 Vowels
open back unrounded vowel (in English spa)
open-mid front unrounded vowel (in English bed)
near-close near-front unrounded vowel (in English bit)
close-mid back rounded vowel (in French eau and English snow)
close back rounded vowel (in Spanish tu and English you)

There are no words in the Klingon language that contain * or *.

Syllable structure
Klingon follows a strict syllable structure. A syllable must start with a consonant (including the glottal stop) followed by one vowel. In prefixes and rare other syllables, this is enough. More commonly, this consonant-vowel pair is followed by one consonant or one of three biconsonantal codas: /- - -/. Thus,  "record",  "poison" and  "targ" (a type of animal) are all legal syllable forms, but * and * are not. Despite this, one suffix takes the shape vowel+consonant: the endearment suffix .

Stress
In addition, stress may shift to a suffix that is meant to be emphasized.

In nouns, the final syllable of the stem (the noun itself, excluding any affixes) is stressed.

The stress in other words seems to be variable, but this is not a serious issue because most of these words are only one syllable in length. There are some words which should fall under the rules above, but do not, although using the standard rules would still be acceptable.

Grammar

Klingon is an agglutinative language, using mainly affixes in order to alter the function or meaning of words. Some nouns have inherently plural forms, such as  "plate" (vs.  "plates"), but most nouns require a suffix to express plurality explicitly. Depending on the type of noun (body part, being capable of using language, or neither) the suffix changes. (However, a plural suffix is never obligatory.

Klingon nouns take suffixes to indicate grammatical number. There are three noun classes, two levels of deixis, and a possession and syntactic function. In all, twenty-nine noun suffixes from five classes may be employed:  "for my beloved true friends". A word may carry no more than one suffix from each class, and the classes have a specific order of appearance.

Verbs in Klingon take a prefix indicating the number and person of the subject and object, whereas suffixes are taken from nine ordered classes and a special suffix class called rovers. Each of the four known rovers has a unique rule controlling its position among the suffixes in the verb. Verbs are marked for aspect, certainty, predisposition and volition, dynamic, causative, mood, negation, and honorific. The Klingon verb has two moods: indicative and imperative.

The most common word order in Klingon is object–verb–subject, and, in most cases, the word order is the exact reverse of English for an equivalent sentence:

(Hyphens are used in the above only to illustrate the use of affixes. Hyphens are not used in Klingon.)

An important aspect of Klingon grammar is its "ungrammaticality". As with for example Japanese, shortening of communicative statements is common, and is called "Clipped Klingon" ( or, more simply) and Ritualized Speech. Clipped Klingon is especially useful in situations where speed is a decisive factor. Grammar is abbreviated, and sentence parts deemed to be superfluous are dropped. Intentional ungrammaticality is widespread, and it takes many forms.

Writing systems

When written in the Latin alphabet, Klingon is unusual in being case-sensitive, with some letters written in capitals and others in lowercase. One phoneme, the vowel , is written capital to look more like the IPA symbol for the sound /ɪ/, and can pose problems when writing Klingon in sans-serif fonts such as Arial, as it looks almost the same as the consonant .

This has led some Klingon enthusiasts to write it lowercase like the other vowels ("i") to prevent confusion, but this use is non-canonical. Instead, a serif font that clearly distinguishes "" and "", such as Courier or Courier New, has traditionally been employed for writing Klingon in the Latin alphabet. In any case, it can be disambiguated through context, as  never occurs next to another vowel, while  always does. The apostrophe, denoting the glottal stop, is considered a letter, not a punctuation mark, as with a Hawaiian 'okina.
 

Klingon is often written in (in-universe, "transliterated to") the Latin alphabet as used above, but on the television series, the Klingons use their own alien writing system. When Klingon symbols are used in Star Trek productions, they are merely decorative graphic elements, designed to emulate real writing and create an appropriate atmosphere. Enthusiasts have settled on the name  for this writing system.

The Astra Image Corporation designed the symbols currently used to "write" Klingon for Star Trek: The Motion Picture, although these symbols are often incorrectly attributed to Michael Okuda. They based the letters on the Klingon battlecruiser hull markings (three letters) first created by Matt Jefferies and on Tibetan writing because the script has sharp letter forms—used as a testament to the Klingons' love for knives and blades.

For April Fools' Day in 2013, Nokia and typography company Dalton Maag claimed to have used "communication devices to far-flung star systems" to assist them in localizing the Nokia Pure font to the Klingon writing system. Though the explanation was of course humorous in nature, as part of the practical joke a series of real fonts based upon the most commonly used  character mapping were in fact developed, and have been made available for free download.

Vocabulary
A design principle of the Klingon language is the great degree of lexical-cultural correlation in the vocabulary. For example, there are several words meaning "to fight" or "to clash against", each having a different degree of intensity. There is an abundance of words relating to warfare and weaponry and also a great variety of curses (cursing is considered a fine art in Klingon culture). This helps lend a particular character to the language.

There are many in-jokes built into the language.

Many English words do not have direct translations into Klingon.

Example sentences

Do you speak Klingon?

I don't understand.

I can't eat that thing.

You are wrong.

Revenge is a dish best served cold. (lit: When cold revenge is served, the dish is always very good)

Today is a good day to die.

See also

 Klingon culture
 Klingon grammar
 Stovokor, a death metal band whose lyrics are written in Klingon
 , the first Klingon opera
 Klingon Christmas Carol, a staged adaptation of Charles Dickens's A Christmas Carol in Klingon

Notes

References

Biblography
Bernard Comrie, 1995, "The Paleo-Klingon numeral system". HolQeD 4.4: 6–10.
Klingon ConScript Unicode Registry (CSUR)
pIqaD Support
Klingon (pIqaD) Unicode font (–)
Klingon text converter (transliteration)

External links

 Klingon Language Institute
 Klingonska Akademien
 qepHom Saarbrücken The largest annual Klingon language meeting in Europe
 Klingon Language Wiki Open encyclopedia about the Klingon language
 Klingon and its User: A Sociolinguistic Profile, a sociolinguistics MA thesis
 
 Is Klingon an Ohlonean language? A comparison of Mutsun and Klingon
 Omniglot: Klingon Alphabet
 Eatoni Ergonomics' Klingon page includes BDF, TTF fonts and a Klingon text entry demo
 paqʼbatlh: The Klingon Epic
 Klingon speaking chatbot
 Klingon word list and spell checker
 photo editor translated into Klingon

 
Agglutinative languages
Object–verb–subject languages
Constructed languages introduced in the 1970s
1979 introductions
Star Trek